Porosły-Kolonia  is a village in the administrative district of Gmina Choroszcz, within Białystok County, Podlaskie Voivodeship, in north-eastern Poland.

Transport 
Roads in Porosły-Kolonia:
  Helsinki – Kaunas – Warszawa – Praga,
  Kudowa-Zdrój - Wrocław - Warszawa - Białystok - Suwałki - Budzisko,

In Porosły-Kolonia on  National Road  Building express way  on section Białystok - Stare Jeżewo long 24,5 km 15,2mile.

References

Villages in Białystok County